A prince-abbot is a title for a cleric who is a Prince of the Church (like a Prince-bishop), in the sense of an ex officio temporal lord of a feudal entity, usually a State of the Holy Roman Empire. The territory ruled by a prince-abbey is known as a princely abbey,  a prince-abbacy or an abbey principality. The holder, however, does not hold the ecclesiastical office of a bishop.

The designated abbey may be a community of either monks or nuns. Thus, because of the possibility of it being a female monastery, an abbey-principality is one of the few cases in which the rule can be restricted to female incumbents, styled Princess-Abbess.

In some cases, the holder was a Prince of the Holy Roman Empire (Reichsfürst), with a seat and a direct vote (votum virile) in the Imperial Diet. Most immediate abbots however, while bearing the title of a "Prince-Abbot", only held the status of an Imperial prelate with a collective vote in the Imperial Diet. The Imperial prelates were represented in the Diet by the envoys of the Swabian Circle and the Rhenish College, both holding one collective vote. Actual Prince-Abbots were:
 the Abbot of Fulda, "Archchancellor of the Empress", according to a 1220 decree by Emperor Frederick II, elevated to a Prince-Bishopric by Pope Benedict XIV in 1752
 the Abbot of Prüm, elevated by Emperor Frederick II in 1222, held in personal union by the Archbishop of Trier from 1576
 the Abbot of Kempten, confirmed by King Charles IV in 1348
 the Abbot of Murbach, elevated by King Ferdinand I in 1548
 the Abbot of Stavelot-Malmedy
 the Abbot of Corvey, elevated to a Prince-Bishop in 1792
 the Princess-Abbess of Quedlinburg

See also
 Prince-Bishop
 Prince-Provost

References

Catholic ecclesiastical titles
Heads of state
Religious leadership roles
Princes